Pseudoblepharisma is a genus of heterotrich ciliates inhabiting oxygen depleted freshwater habitats. Most sources report that it contains one species, Pseudoblepharisma tenue, but at least four have been seen in literature.

'Pseudoblepharisma tenue was originally described in Germany as Blepharisma tenuis. Starting in 2006, it was recognized that the German strain may have two bacterial symbionts, one pink, one green. In 2021, both symbionts were confirmed to be photosynthetic: a Chlorella sp. K10 (green algae), discovered earlier as a symbiont of Hydra viridissima; and Ca. Thiodictyon intracellulare (Chromatiaceae), a purple sulfur bacterium that has lost its sulfur-metabolizing genes. The complexity of such a tripartite symbiosis is novel to science.

European reports also mentioned a variant P. tenue var. viride, which only has green symbionts. In 2022, one strain matching these descriptions was found in tropical freshwaters of Florida, North America. Unlike its the bicolor European counterpart, it builds a lorica (shell) around itself.

The current taxonomy is inconsistent with molecular phylogeny using SSU rRNA; the latter places the genus sister to Spirostomum.

References

Heterotrichea
Alveolata genera